Exeed (stylized EXEED) is an automotive division of premium sport utility vehicles introduced by Chinese automobile manufacturer Chery Automobile in September 2017.

History
The Exeed marque was introduced on September 14, 2017 at International Motor Show Germany in Frankfurt with the TX concept vehicle, a mid-size SUV wearing Chery badges. The first Exeed-branded vehicle to be revealed is the Exeed LX concept revealed at Auto China on April 29, 2018 in Beijing.

The first production Exeed model launched was the Exeed TX/TXL mid-size SUV in March 2019. Next month in April at Auto Shanghai, a third Exeed concept vehicle was revealed, the E-IUV. In October, Exeed launched its second production vehicle, the Chery Tiggo 7-based LX compact SUV.

By the end of the year on November 22, 2019 at Auto Guangzhou, a concept vehicle, called the VX, previewing the brand's flagship SUV was revealed. The production Exeed VX full-size SUV was released in January 2020.

In February 2020, it was announced that the Exeed TXL and VX would be sold in the United States by HAAH Automotive Holdings as the Vantas TXL and VX. These models were planned to be launched in 2021. In April 2021, the Vantas brand release date was pushed back to 2022 and it was announced that the first models would be exported from China to the United States. However, later in July, HAAH filed for bankruptcy and the plans for Vantas and the company's other entry-level brand, T-GO, which planned to sell the second-gen Chery Tiggo 7, were abandoned.

In April 2021 at Auto Shanghai, Exeed revealed the marque's fifth concept SUV, the Stellar, an electric mid-size SUV.

Vehicles

Current models
Exeed currently sells the following SUVs:

 LX/Zhuifeng (2019–present), a compact SUV based on the Chery Tiggo 7
 TX (2019–present), a mid-size SUV
 TXL/Lingyun (2019–present), an extended version of the TX
 VX/Lanyue (2020–present), a full-size SUV
 Yaoguang (2023–present), a mid-size SUV

Concept vehicles
 E-IUV (2019), a compact electric SUV
 LX concept (2018), a compact electric SUV
 Stellar (2021), a mid-size electric SUV
 TX concept (2017), a mid-size SUV previewing the production TX, badged as a Chery
 VX concept (2019), a full-size SUV previewing the production VX

References

Chery
2017 establishments in China